Neoscaptia aequalis is a moth of the family Erebidae. It was described by Karl Jordan in 1905. It is found on New Guinea.

References

 

Moths described in 1905
Lithosiini